Rocky Brook is a tributary of the Millstone River in Monmouth and Mercer counties, New Jersey, in the United States.

Course

It flows parallel to CR-1 (Sweetmans Lane) before draining into Perrineville Lake. It continues flowing west into the northern areas of Perrineville Lake Park. It then turns northwest and crosses Perrineville Road and flows through the Etra Road Open Space area.

It continues flowing west alongside Etra Road and crosses the New Jersey Turnpike. It then flows into Peddie Lake in the heart of Hightstown. It crosses Route 33 and flows past the Town Center Plaza and Shopping Center before crossing Route 130 and the Hightstown Bypass.

Tributaries

Timber Run

Lakes

There are numerous lakes that flow along the course of the brook. Notably, there is: 

Perrineville Lake in Millstone

Etra Lake in East Windsor

Peddie Lake in Hightstown (in which it receives its namesake from the nearby Peddie School)

Sister tributaries

Rocky Brook's sister tributaries include:

Beden Brook
Bear Brook
Cranbury Brook
Devils Brook
Shallow Brook
Harrys Brook
Heathcote Brook
Indian Run Brook
Little Bear Brook
Millstone Brook
Peace Brook
Royce Brook
Simonson Brook
Six Mile Run
Stony Brook
Ten Mile Run
Van Horn Brook

See also
List of rivers of New Jersey

References

External links
USGS Coordinates in Google Maps

Tributaries of the Raritan River
Rivers of New Jersey
Rivers of Mercer County, New Jersey
Rivers of Monmouth County, New Jersey